The Interactive Software Federation of Europe (ISFE) is an independent federation, representing the interests of the video game industry in Europe to the main stakeholders: EU institutions, international organisations, academics, or the general public. This objective is pursued through a variety of actions, such as meetings, conferences, sponsorships and informational actions aimed towards the public.

History 

Founded in 1998, the ISFE initially only included the national interactive software trade associations of the UK, France, Germany and the Netherlands. In January 2002, the ISFE opened up to include any company representing the industry within the 30 member states of the European Economic Area, plus Switzerland.

In 2002 the ISFE was registered under Belgian law as an international association with scientific and pedagogical purposes. In April 2003, ISFE founded PEGI ('Pan European Game Information) which has become the gaming industry's rating system for Europe. The ISFE secretariat is located in Brussels.

Activities
ISFE's main activities regard the following goals:

 Creating European awareness
 Providing information to consumers
 Providing research/market data
 Supporting national representation in all EU countries
 Acting against software piracy

Members

Game publishers
 Activision Blizzard
 Bandai Namco Entertainment Europe
 Electronic Arts
 Gameloft
 King
 Microsoft Europe
 Nintendo of Europe
 SEGA Europe
 SIE Europe
 Square Enix
 Supercell
 Take-Two Interactive Software
 Ubisoft
 Warner Bros. Interactive Entertainment
 Wooga

Local interactive software associations
 Österreichischer Verband der Unterhaltungssoftware (OVUS) - Austria (German Wikipedia)
 Belgian Entertainment Association (BEA) - Belgium
 Syndicat des Editeurs de Logiciels de Loisir (SELL) - France
 Bundesverband für Interaktive Unterhaltungssoftware (BIU) - Germany (German Wikipedia)
 Associazione Editori Sviluppatori Videogiochi Italiani (AESVI) - Italy
 Nederlandse Vereniging van Producenten en Importeurs van beeld - en geluidsdragers (NVPI) - the Netherlands
 Association for the Nordic Game Industry (ANGI) - Nordic region
 Stowarzyszenie Producentów i Dystrybutorów Oprogramowania Rozrywkowego (Spidor) - Poland
 Associação de Empresas Produtoras e Distribuidoras de Videojogos (AEPDV) - Portugal
 Asociación Española de Videojuegos (AEVI) - Spain
 Swiss Interactive Entertainment Association (SIEA) - Switzerland
 The Association for UK Interactive Entertainment (UKIE) - United Kingdom

References

Information technology organizations based in Europe
Video game organizations